Robert Constantin Petre (born 27 April 1997) is a Romanian professional footballer who plays as a midfielder for Liga III club CSM Reșița.

References

External links
 
 

1997 births
Living people
Sportspeople from Craiova
Romanian footballers
Association football defenders
Liga I players
Liga II players
Liga III players
CS Universitatea Craiova players
ACS Viitorul Târgu Jiu players
CS Pandurii Târgu Jiu players
CSM Reșița players